In the Roman army of the late Republic and the Principate, the  ("broad-striped tribune") was one of the six military tribunes in a legion. Usually, they were a young man around the age of 20 that belonged to a wealthy family. Or they were friends with the legate.

Overview 
The post was created by the Marian reforms. It was common for the tribunus laticlavius to be a Roman noble younger than 25. Usually around 20. They were commonly either part of the richest families in Rome or be a close friend to the legionary commander. It was also common for the tribune to have no previous military experience. It was common for the tribune to return to Rome and run for a political office, usually a quaestorship after two or three years as a tribune. The position was the first step of the traditional . By the middle of 250s AD, at the earliest, the post of the  had disappeared from the Roman army, following the general trend of removal of the senatorial class from military commands.

See also 

 List of Roman army unit types
 Centurion
 Legatus 
 Primus Pilus
 Decanus
 
 Tribune

References 

Military ranks of ancient Rome